Companies listed on the New York Stock Exchange are in the following lists, alphabetically.

 Companies listed on the New York Stock Exchange (0–9)
 Companies listed on the New York Stock Exchange (A)
 Companies listed on the New York Stock Exchange (B)
 Companies listed on the New York Stock Exchange (C)
 Companies listed on the New York Stock Exchange (D)
 Companies listed on the New York Stock Exchange (E)
 Companies listed on the New York Stock Exchange (F)
 Companies listed on the New York Stock Exchange (G)
 Companies listed on the New York Stock Exchange (H)
 Companies listed on the New York Stock Exchange (I)
 Companies listed on the New York Stock Exchange (J)
 Companies listed on the New York Stock Exchange (K)
 Companies listed on the New York Stock Exchange (L)
 Companies listed on the New York Stock Exchange (M)
 Companies listed on the New York Stock Exchange (N)
 Companies listed on the New York Stock Exchange (O)
 Companies listed on the New York Stock Exchange (P)
 Companies listed on the New York Stock Exchange (Q)
 Companies listed on the New York Stock Exchange (R)
 Companies listed on the New York Stock Exchange (S)
 Companies listed on the New York Stock Exchange (T)
 Companies listed on the New York Stock Exchange (U)
 Companies listed on the New York Stock Exchange (V)
 Companies listed on the New York Stock Exchange (W)
 Companies listed on the New York Stock Exchange (X)
 Companies listed on the New York Stock Exchange (Y)
 Companies listed on the New York Stock Exchange (Z)